Somera viridifusca, the prominent moth, is a moth of the family Notodontidae described by Francis Walker in 1855. It is found in Sri Lanka, Sundaland, the Philippines, Sulawesi, the north-eastern Himalayas, Sikkim in India, Hainan and Yunnan in China and in Taiwan.

Description
Males have brown pedipalps, greenish head and thorax vertices and a fuscous abdomen, with a greenish extremity. The forewings are bright green with a brown patch below and beyond the end of the cell (absent in some specimens), with two subbasal waved dark lines, two antemedial and four postmedial streaks and a single submarginal streak has brownish blotches. The hindwings are fuscous.

The larvae are yellow green with a double yellow dorsal line. The area below the subdorsal stripe is green. The head is greyish white with olive markings. Pupation takes place underground.

References

Moths described in 1855
Notodontidae